City United Reformed Church is a Grade II*-listed building located in Windsor Place, Cardiff. Originally constructed in 1866, it was listed in 1975. 

The church was designed in a Neogothic style by the Scottish architect Frederick Thomas Pilkington, and originally belonged to the Presbyterian denomination. The same architect was also responsible for Barclay Viewforth Church in Edinburgh. Pilkington made a point of using local materials and created a gabled roof with an octagonal spire. In 1893, the west front was redesigned by another architect, E. M. Bruce Vaughan, who built a new porch. After a fire in 1910, Vaughan added a new hammerbeam roof.  

In 1972, when the United Reformed Church was created by a merger of the Congregational Church in England and Wales and the Presbyterian Church of England, City URC became part of the Province of Wales within the new denomination.

References

External links
 

Grade II* listed churches in Cardiff
Churches completed in 1866
United Reformed churches in Wales
19th-century churches in the United Kingdom